HD 154857 is a star with two exoplanetary companions in the southern constellation of Ara. It is too dim to be visible with the naked eye having an apparent visual magnitude of 7.25. The star is located at a distance of 207 light years from the Sun based on parallax measurements, and is drifting further away with a radial velocity of +28 km/s.

This is a G-type star with a stellar classification of G5IV-V. The absolute magnitude of this star is two magnitudes above the main sequence, which suggests that the star is evolving toward the subgiant stage. It is a metal-poor thin disk star approximately six billion years old and is chromopherically quiet although not in a Maunder Minimum state. The star is larger, more massive, and more luminous than the Sun. It is spinning with a projected rotational velocity of 1.4 km/s.

Planetary system

The discovery of one confirmed and one unconfirmed Jovian exoplanet was reported in 2004 and 2007 respectively. The former planet HD 154857 b has mass >1.8 times that of Jupiter. It orbits the star 20% further than Earth-Sun distance, taking 409 days with 47% eccentricity. The additional object (HD 154857 c) was confirmed as a planetary companion in January 2014.

See also

 List of extrasolar planets

References

External links
 
 http://planetquest.jpl.nasa.gov

G-type subgiants
Planetary systems with two confirmed planets

Ara (constellation)
Durchmusterung objects
154857
084069